Brian J. Flaherty is a Republican politician from Watertown, Connecticut. Flaherty served eight terms as State Representative for the 68th Assembly District from 1988 to 2005 and held the position of Deputy Minority Leader in the Connecticut House of Representatives for 10 years.

Career

Flaherty was first elected to the Connecticut House of Representatives in 1988 at the age of 23. 
During his tenure, Brian was ranked by his colleagues as one of the top 10 most effective House members according to a Connecticut Magazine poll.  Flaherty was also honored as “Legislator of the Year” by the Connecticut Library Association, the Greater Hartford Chamber of Commerce, the Connecticut Council of Small Towns, and the Connecticut Conference of Independent Colleges.  He was a staunch advocate for higher education, and co-authored legislation creating Connecticut's statewide education computer network and the Connecticut Digital Library.

Upon his retiring from the Connecticut House of Representatives in 2005, Governor of Connecticut M. Jodi Rell appointed Flaherty to the Board of Governors for Higher Education, where he is currently serving as Vice-Chairman of the state's coordinating agency for Connecticut colleges and universities.  Flaherty is also Director of Public Affairs for Nestlé Waters North America where he directs the company's government and legislative affairs program as well as community outreach.

Flaherty appears periodically as a Republican political analyst for Hartford-based WFSB TV's political and current events program Face the State alongside Democratic analyst Duby McDowell. WFSB is Connecticut's CBS News affiliate.

Education

Flaherty graduated from Holy Cross High School and earned his bachelor's degree from Fairfield University in 1987.

References

External links
Farewell Address to the House of Representatives, May 22, 2003
Connecticut House of Representatives Profile

Members of the Connecticut House of Representatives
Fairfield University alumni
Living people
1965 births
People from Watertown, Connecticut